Angelina Yates (born 1980) is a New Zealand netball player in the ANZ Championship, playing for the Northern Mystics.

References
ANZ Championship profile

1980 births
Living people
New Zealand netball players
Northern Mystics players
ANZ Championship players
Northern Force players